Four ships of the Royal Navy have been named Bullfinch.

 , an Albacore-class gunvessel
 , a Plover-class gunvessel
 , a Bullfinch-class destroyer
 , a cable-laying ship

Royal Navy ship names